Mokra may refer to the following places:
Mokra, Łódź Voivodeship (central Poland)
Mokra, Silesian Voivodeship (south Poland)
Mokra, Świętokrzyskie Voivodeship (south-central Poland)
Mokra, Greater Poland Voivodeship (west-central Poland)
Mokra, Lubusz Voivodeship (west Poland)
Mokra, Opole Voivodeship (south-west Poland)
Mokra, Serbia, a village in the municipality of Bela Palanka, Pirot District, Serbia
Mokra, Estonia, a village in Misso Parish, Võru County, Estonia
Mokra, Albania, a region in Albania
, a mountain in Montenegro
Mokra, North Macedonia (Jakupica), a mountain range in the central part of North Macedonia

See also
Mokra Mountain (disambiguation)
Mokra Gora, a village in the municipality of Užice, Zlatibor District, Serbia
Mokra Gora (mountain), a mountain in Kosovo, Montenegro and Serbia